Chocolates on the Pillow Aren't Enough: Reinventing the Customer Experience is a book on customer service advice.  It was released in March 2007.

Overview 

This is the second book by Jonathan Tisch, the Chairman and CEO of Loews Hotels.  In Chocolates on the Pillow Aren't Enough, he shares customer relation lessons he's learned during his career in the hospitality industry. Using popular companies such as In-N-Out Burger, Commerce Bank, Urban Outfitters as case studies, Tisch elaborates on the relation between customer service and business success. His advice covers:

 Using technology to create intimate connections with customers.
 Finding ways to expand an organization's offerings beyond their basic product or service.
 How to recognize customers' needs for physical and psychological safety.
 Perfect the "art of the welcome," in both physical and virtual spaces.
 Balance the growing demand for transparency with realistic needs for security and confidentiality.

The book has received coverage on CNBC's "Power Lunch," ESPN's "Cold Pizza," and PBS's "Nightly Business Report." Author Jonathan Tisch was a guest on NBC's The Today Show on March 2, 2007 discussing open exchange and on CBS's Early Show on March 7, 2007 where he discussed the book's strong customer service message using the Build-A-Bear company as a model.

References 

 YouTube, Expanded Books, The Ultimate in Customer Care
 CBS, The Early Show, Jonathan Tisch appearance
YouTube, NBC, The Today Show, Jonathan Tisch appearance

Business books
2007 non-fiction books